This articles lists various works of fiction that take place in Boston, Massachusetts:

Video games

A number of popular video games are set in Boston, with several characters from the city appearing in multiple games.

 The Scout, a character in the video game Team Fortress 2 is from Boston and speaks with a Boston accent.
Ash, a character in Ubisoft's Rainbow Six Siege, studied at Boston University. Another character, Delta Force operator Erik "Maverick" Thorn, is from Boston.
In Tony Hawk's Underground 2, one of the levels is set in Boston.
Mafia: The City of Lost Heaven the City of Lost Heaven bears a slight resemblance to Boston.
In Rock Band and Rock Band 2, Boston is a featured city that one's fictional band can play gigs in.
In Assassin's Creed III, Boston features as a main city during the course of the game.
In The Last of Us, some of the game is set in post-apocalyptic Boston.
Nathan and Samuel Drake, characters from the Uncharted franchise, grew up in Boston
Fallout 4 is set in Boston, as well as surrounding areas such as Concord, Quincy, and Lexington.
AaAaAA!!! – A Reckless Disregard for Gravity is set in an alternate reality version of Boston.
Call of Cthulhu: Dark Corners of the Earth takes place in Boston, taking after H.P. Lovecraft's works.

Literature
’’While the music lasts’’ William M. Bulger
Alone by Lisa Gardner
Altered States by Paddy Chayefsky
As I was Crossing Boston Common by Norma Farber
Back Bay by William Martin
The Big Dig by Linda Barnes
Blaze by Richard Bachman
The "Bloody Jack" historical-fiction series, by L. A. Meyer, first mentioned in The Curse of the Blue Tattoo, when Jacky is put off in Boston to attend Lawson Peabody's School for Young Girls
Boston Adventure by Jean Stafford
A Boston Girl,  Anita Diamant
The Bostonians by Henry James; life in aristocratic Boston during the late nineteenth century
Carlotta Carlyle Mysteries by Linda Barnes; featuring a taxi-driving detective in Boston
A Case of Need by Michael Crichton
 A Catch of Consequence by Diana Norman
 Caucasia, by Danzy Senna, a coming of age novel of Birdie, a biracial girl
Cell by Stephen King; a traditional zombie story set in present-day Boston
The Chippendales by Robert Grant, novel, old Boston society confronted by the emerging new in the 1880s
Combat Boy by James Vance Elliott, a novel featuring both the Boston crime world of the 70s and the Massachusetts high-tech world of the 90s
Crisis by Robin Cook, novel, early 21st century; begins with a tale of two doctors, one practicing in NYC and one in Boston, with the former's trial for malpractice taking place in Boston; most of the action occurs in Boston
The Da Vinci Code by Dan Brown; Boston is the home of protagonist Robert Langdon
The Dandy Vigilante by Kevin Daley, a hard-boiled mystery about a Boston news reporter, crime, and city hall corruption
The Dante Club, a murder mystery featuring Harvard personalities Henry Wadsworth Longfellow, James Russell Lowell, and Oliver Wendell Holmes, as well as publisher James T. Fields; takes place in Boston and Cambridge, by Matthew Pearl (2003)
Dead Heat by Linda Barnes
Easter Rising by Michael Patrick MacDonald
The Europeans by Henry James
Fair Game by Patricia Briggs. Takes place in an urban fantasy version of Boston that features some of the real life historic sites and culture.
 Fallout by Harry Turtledove, an alternate history novel in the Hot War series, where the Korean War escalates into World War III, the city was destroyed by a Soviet atomic bomb in May 1952. The blast also burned the USS Constitution to the waterline.
Find Me by Laura van den Berg
Firmin by Sam Savage, a magical-realist account of the destruction of Scollay Square
Flashpoint by Linda Barnes
Flynn's World by Gregory Mcdonald
Future Boston a shared universe novel by the Cambridge Science Fiction Writers Workshop
The Given Day, novel by Dennis Lehane, takes place in post-World War I Boston
Gone, Baby, Gone by Dennis Lehane
The Handmaid's Tale by Margaret Atwood; post-nuclear Cambridge and Boston are the setting of this dystopian novel
Home Before Dark by Eileen Bassing
Infinite Jest by David Foster Wallace, set in a partly fictionalized Boston
Innocence by David Hosp; Boston is the main setting of this thriller/courtroom novel
Intuition by Allegra Goodman
Johnny Tremain by Esther Forbes takes place in Boston in the early 1770s
Kane and Abel, Jeffrey Archer's novel about rivalry; William Kane is from Boston
Karma and Other Stories, short stories by Rishi Reddi
Last Dance by Lee Grove
The Last Hurrah by Edwin O'Connor; O'Connor's 1956 account of big-city politics, inspired by the career of longtime Boston Mayor James Michael Curley
Last Night in Twisted River by John Irving (2009), partly set in the North End
The Late George Apley by John P. Marquand; tragicomic satire of the life of an upper-class Bostonian from the mid-19th century to the Great Depression; winner of the Pulitzer Prize
Little House by Boston Bay by Melissa Wiley
Looking Backward, utopian novel written in 1887 and set in Boston in 2000
Love Story by Erich Segal
Magnus Chase and the Gods of Asgard by Rick Riordan
Make Way for Ducklings, iconic children's picture book set in Boston Public Garden
"The Magic Bonbons" by Lyman Frank Baum, his American Fairy Tales, 1901
A Modern Instance by William Dean Howells
Murder at Fenway Park by Troy Soos
Mystic River by Dennis Lehane
The Namesake by Jhumpa Lahiri, set largely in Cambridge and Boston, explores the difficulties of Indian-Americans making their homes in America
Oh Boy, Boston by Patricia Reilly Giff; the Polk Street Kids take a trip to Boston
On Beauty, novel by Zadie Smith (2005), takes place partly in a fictional town outside Boston; parts of Boston center are visited
The Paper Chase, novel by John Jay Osborn, Jr. (1970)
The Passionate Mistakes and Intricate Corruption of One Girl in America, in which Michelle Tea charts the turbulent adventures in Boston's teenage goth world
Pickman's Model by H. P. Lovecraft; takes place in Boston
Professor Romeo by Anne Bernays
The Pursuit of Alice Thrift by Elinor Lipman
Rare Objects by Kathleen Tessaro
Rent Girl, Michelle Tea's graphic memoir of sex work in Boston, illustrated by Laurenn McCubbin
The Rise of Silas Lapham by William Dean Howells
Run by Ann Patchett is set in modern Cambridge and Boston; a novel exploring family and race relations
Running Man by Richard Bachman takes place partly in Boston
The "Sarah Kelling / Max Bittersohn" mystery series by Charlotte MacLeod
The Scarlet Letter by Nathaniel Hawthorne
Shutter Island, novel by Dennis Lehane, takes place on a fictional island on the Boston Harbor
Small Vices by Robert B. Parker
The Sound and the Fury by William Faulkner; part of the story occurs in Boston
The Southern Victory Series by Harry Turtledove; has many characters who live in or are from the Boston area
The "Spenser" detective novels, by Robert B. Parker
The Technologists by Matthew Pearl (2012); alternative history about the founding of MIT
 Thin Air by Robert B. Parker
The Tucker Mysteries, by Ray Daniel (author)*Under Copp's Hill by Katherine Ayres; children's story set in 1908
Unleavened Bread by Judge Robert Grant, set partly in Boston
The Vanished Child by Sarah Smith (writer), set partly in Boston
The Virgin Knows by Christine Palamidessi Moore; sibling rivalry and art theft (from the basements of Harvard's Fogg); set in Boston's Italian North End
Vital Signs by Robin Cook; Boston is the home of protagonist Marissa Blumenthal
You Can't Take a Balloon into the Museum of Fine Arts by Jacqueline Preiss Weitzman; a children's picture book about a girl's lost balloon floating past landmarks in Boston
Zodiac by Neal Stephenson; an eco-thriller focusing on industrial pollution in Boston Harbor

Television
A number of popular television series are set in Boston, four of which were notably created by David E. Kelley, who grew up in suburban Boston.

Ally McBeal, romantic comedy popular in the late '90s, created by David E. Kelley of Belmont, Massachusetts
Banacek, detective series starring George Peppard as Thomas Banacek
Being Human, a werewolf, a ghost and a vampire share a house in Boston
The Best Years, Canadian TV show set at a fictional Boston College
Between the Lines, short-lived TV series based on the movie of the same title
Boston Common, comedy about attending a fictional Boston college, featuring Anthony Clark
Boston Legal, centered on a Boston law firm, created by David E. Kelley
Boston Public, centered on a Boston public school, also created by David E. Kelley
Chasing Life, about a journalist in Boston who is diagnosed with leukemia
Cheers, by Charles-Burrow-Charles Productions and Paramount Pictures; centered on a Boston bar, which in reality is the Bull & Finch Pub. In the sequel to Cheers, Frasier, Dr. Frasier Crane frequently refers to Boston.
Crossing Jordan, crime drama, follows the lives of Boston Medical Examiner Jordan Cavanaugh and her co-workers
Dr. Quinn, Medicine Woman, in the episodes "Where the Heart is", Parts 1 and 2.
Dawson's Creek, teen drama 1998–2003; in Season 5 the main characters go to college in Boston
Falling Skies, sci-fi drama set in Boston and the surrounding areas
Fringe, set in Boston and surrounding area
Goodnight Beantown, sitcom dating to 1983
How High, set at Harvard
James at 15, later retitled James at 16
Leverage, set in Boston
The Paper Chase, based on the 1970 novel and the 1973 film of the same title
Park Street Under
Paul Sand in Friends and Lovers, a short-lived 1974–75 situation comedy featuring Paul Sand as a double bass player for the Boston Symphony Orchestra
The Handmaid's Tale, takes place in Boston following the establishment of a neo-Puritanic totalitarian state, Gilead.
The Practice, centered on a Boston law firm, also created by David E. Kelley
Rizzoli & Isles, drama starring Angie Harmon as Police Detective Jane Rizzoli and Sasha Alexander as Medical Examiner Dr. Maura Isles
Sabrina, the Teenage Witch
St. Elsewhere, drama set in the fictional St. Eligius Hospital in Boston
Spenser: For Hire, featuring Robert Urich playing the Robert B. Parker character
 Suite Life of Zack & Cody, comedy made for the younger audience; takes place in a fictional hotel in Boston
survivors remorse, the family is from dorchester
Two Guys and a Girl
Unhitched, about a group of newly single friends learning the lessons of starting over in their 30s
The X-Files, in "Medusa" (Episode 12 of Season 8), Agents Doggett and Scully investigate suspicious deaths on the Boston subway system

Film
A number of films have been set in Boston or Greater Boston.

 21, a fictionalized account of the very-unofficial MIT Blackjack Team
 Altered States, Ken Russell film based on Paddy Chayefsky's novel
 Between the Lines
 Black Mass, about the criminal career of infamous Irish-American mobster Whitey Bulger
 Blown Away, depicts the Boston Bomb Squad dealing with a mad bomber
 Blue Hill Avenue, about four childhood friends from Dorchester who grow up to become drug dealers
 The Boondock Saints, about two Irish immigrant brothers in Boston who become vigilantes
 The Boondock Saints II: All Saints Day, sequel to The Boondock Saints, in which the brothers are forced to return to Boston
 The Boston Strangler, depicting a famous serial killer, played by Tony Curtis
 The Bostonians
 The Brink's Job, about the famous robbery of the Brinks security transport in the North End
 Celtic Pride, about two diehard Boston Celtics fans
 Charly, based on Flowers for Algernon, about a mentally challenged man who receives treatment for his disability
 A Civil Action, about several families who attempt to sue a company for dumping toxic waste that gave their children leukemia; filmed all over Boston, ironically not in Woburn, where it takes place, but in Palmer
 Coma is set at the fictional Boston Memorial Hospital
 The Company Men, starring Ben Affleck, Chris Cooper, Tommy Lee Jones and Kevin Costner
 The Core, in an early scene, people with pacemakers mysteriously drop dead during Green World Day; it is later known that the core stopped rotating
 The Departed, Martin Scorsese's 2006 hit film, takes place in Boston, with prominent use of Boston landmarks and culture; winner of the Academy Award for Best Picture
 Dirty Tricks, 1981 film starring Elliott Gould as a Harvard professor involved in an historical crime caper
 Edge of Darkness, 2010 crime thriller starring Mel Gibson
 The Equalizer, starring Denzel Washington
 The 2005 remake of Fever Pitch, about a man's obsession with the Boston Red Sox
 Field of Dreams, Ray Kinsella's journey takes him through Boston to fetch Terence Mann and attend a game at Fenway Park.
 The Firm, film's opening takes place at Harvard
 The Forbidden Kingdom, martial arts comedy-drama about a Boston boy who enters a Chinese fantasy world, with Jet Li and Jackie Chan
 The Friends of Eddie Coyle, drama about an aging mob gun runner from Quincy who has to choose whether or not to inform on his Irish Mob friends to avoid jail time
 Fuzz, detectives from Boston's 87th Precinct's investigate a murder-extortion racket run by a mysterious deaf man
 The Game Plan
 Godzilla: King of the Monsters (2019 film), in which the climactic kaiju battle starts in Fenway Park and destroys Boston
 Gone Baby Gone, directed by Ben Affleck, takes place and was filmed in Boston
 Good Will Hunting, takes place in Boston: the characters live in South Boston, and some other action is set at Harvard and M.I.T.
 The Handmaid's Tale, set in the Harvard Square area
 Harvard Man, a basketball player strikes a deal with the mob to fix a basketball game
 The Heat, a comedy starring Sandra Bullock based in Boston
 Heaven's Gate, exterior Harvard scenes filmed at Oxford University
 Hollow Point (1996)
 Home Before Dark (1958), set in Boston and Cape Cod; adapted from the novel by Eileen Bassing; original negative is lost
 House of the Damned, all of the interior shots were done in the house of the director, Sean Weathers, in Brooklyn, New York; however, Weathers wanted a different feel for the exteriors so he and his cinematographer drove to Boston to reshoot the exteriors months later without the actors
 The House of Magic takes place in Boston and its hospital.
 Housesitter Ice Princess, takes place in Worcester, MA around the Greater Boston area, about a physics geek who dreams of becoming a professional ice skater and gets an offer to go to Harvard but turns down that offer
 Johnny Tremain, 1957 Disney film based on the novel of the same name
 Knight and Day, starring Tom Cruise and Cameron Diaz
 Knowing The Last Detail, about two United States Navy policemen who decide to take out a young sailor for one last night on the town (through Boston's Combat Zone) before he goes to jail
 The Last Hurrah Legally Blonde, about a UCLA Valley Girl who attempts to get her boyfriend back by entering Harvard Law School
 Lemony Snicket's A Series of Unfortunate Events, takes place in Boston, as seen on the envelope at the end of the movie; "28 Prospero Place, Boston, Massachusetts, USA"
 Little Children, set in a fictional suburb of Boston
 Looking Good by Keith Maillard set in 1969/70 with vivid account of Harvard Square riot
 Love Story Malcolm X, Malcolm's Boston years are chronicled in this film, including his prison years, which led to his eventual conversion to Islam
 The Matchmaker Mona Lisa Smile, featuring Julia Roberts as a nonconformist Wellesley College professor
 Moneyball, featuring Brad Pitt, has a scene at Fenway Park in Boston
 Monument Ave., about low level Charlestown gangsters dealing with the repercussions that arise due to the code of silence
 Motet by Keith Maillard
 My Best Friend's Girl Mystery Street Mystic River, Oscar-winning drama about three childhood friends who later reunite after the murder of one of their daughters; set in a fictional area of Boston called "Buckingham Flats"; filmed in East Boston and South Boston
 The Next Karate Kid, primary scenes are set in the Boston area; filmed partly in Newton
 Next Stop Wonderland, takes place in Boston; the MBTA station Wonderland takes special significance
 Night School Now, Voyager Once Around The Paper Chase, about a student struggling through Harvard Law School, based on the 1970 novel; John Houseman won an Oscar for his role as Professor Kingsfield
 The Proposal Prozac Nation, about a young woman who struggles with depression during her first year at Harvard
 Sacco and Vanzetti, about the famous anarchists convicted of murder
 Shutter Island, thriller starring Leonardo DiCaprio, takes place on an island in Boston Harbor
 A Small Circle of Friends, about Harvard in the 1960s and three students bonding together
 The Social Network, drama about the creation of Facebook; many scenes are set on the Harvard campus
 Soul Man, comedy about a man who poses as a black scholarship winner in order to attend Harvard Law School
 Southie, drama about a man who returns to Southie after leaving for several years to get away from the violence of the gangster life
 Spotlight, fact-based drama about the Boston Globe's investigation of the abuses of the Catholic Church.
 The Spanish Prisoner Starting Over, romantic comedy starring Burt Reynolds about a recent divorcee who relocates to Boston to restart his life
 Still We Believe: The Boston Red Sox Movie, a documentary chronicling the 2003 baseball season of the Boston Red Sox
 Stonados, a Sci-Fi Channel television movie about Boston being ravaged by a rain of exploding rocks (starting with Plymouth Rock) from a freak meteorological event
 The Story of Alexander Graham Bell Surrogates, futuristic police thriller starring Bruce Willis
 Ted (2012) and Ted 2 (2015), starring Mark Wahlberg
 The Thomas Crown Affair (1968), about a wealthy businessman who robs banks for excitement
 Titicut Follies, documentary about Bridgewater State Hospital near Boston, and the lives of its mental patients
 The Town, starring Ben Affleck
 The Verdict, legal drama about an alcoholic Boston lawyer
 Vig (Money Kings), about an honest man who has to become a bookie
 Walk East on Beacon! War of the Worlds, film adaptation of the novel; the film ends with Tom Cruise and his kids finally reaching Boston where his ex-wife lives
 What Doesn't Kill You (2008) South Boston Irish mob crime drama.
 What's the Worst That Could Happen?, about a rich man who catches a thief burglarizing his Boston home and steals the thief's lucky ring, which the thief then tries to get back
 What's Your Number?, starring Chris Evans and Anna Faris
 With Honors (1994), with Brendan Fraser and Joe Pesci, about a Harvard student who loses the only copy of his thesis and traces it to a basement where it has been found by a homeless man who trades pages of the thesis for food and shelter
 X2: X-Men United, X-Men sequel, in which two scenes take place in Boston, the home of Bobby Drake, alias Iceman
 Yellow Lights, college drama that takes place at Wellesley College as well as a fictional college set in Newton
 Zookeeper, shot at Boston's Franklin Park Zoo

Other
 An unaired episode of the Adult Swim animated television series Aqua Teen Hunger Force'', "Boston", makes reference to Boston, as it satires the 2007 Boston bomb scare.

See also

 Bibliography of Boston

References

External links
An annotated bibliography of fiction set in Boston

 
fiction
United States in fiction by city